Bouddha (Nepal bhasa: खास्ति चैत्य;), also known as Boudhanath, Khasti Chaitya and Khāsa Chaitya is a stupa in Kathmandu, Nepal.

The influx of large populations of refugees from Tibet has seen the construction of over 50 gompas (Tibetan monastery) around Boudha. As of 1979, Boudha Stupa is a UNESCO World Heritage Site. Along with Swayambhu, it is one of the most popular tourist sites in the Kathmandu area.

The stupa is on the ancient trade route from Tibet which enters the Kathmandu Valley by the village of Sankhu in the northeast corner and continues to the ancient and smaller stupa of Chabahil named Charumati Stupa (often called "Little Boudhanath"). It then turns directly south, heading over the Bagmati River to Lalitpur, bypassing the main city of Kathmandu (which was built later). Tibetan merchants have rested and offered prayers at Boudha Stupa for many centuries. When refugees entered Nepal from Tibet in the 1950s, many decided to live around Boudhanath. The stupa is said to entomb the remains of Kassapa Buddha.

Mythology behind formation

Newa Buddhist mythology 
According to the history of Nepal, where the Narayanhiti Palace currently stands, once stood the palace of King Vikramaditya (of the Licchavi kingdom). King Vikramaditya instructed that a Lwã Hiti should be built in the southern part of the palace courtyard. When the new dhunge dhara produced no water, the king consulted his astrologers, who suggested that what was needed was a human sacrifice of a male candidate having Battis-Lakshanas, or thirty-two perfections. Only the king himself and his two princes were suitable candidates, so the king decided to sacrifice himself to bring water to the dhunge dhara. According to local mythology, during the sacrifice (performed, at the king's order by one of his sons), the king's head flew off, landing at the nearby Sankhu Bajrayogini Temple.

The prince, with a regretful heart, decided to go to the top of Bajrayogini and cast off a chicken, determined to construct a stupa where it landed. The hen landed in the place where Boudhanath Stupa currently stands. Because the people at that time were managing to survive the drought by collecting  droplets of dew, the place was named Khāsti, a combination of the Nepal Bhasa words for dew ("khas") and drops ("ti").

Later His Majesty's Government of Nepal renamed the place from Khasti to Boudhanath to better reflect the Hinduism of that Hindu nation.

Tibetan Buddhist mythology 
The village that surrounds the great Kāśyapa stupa is generally known by the name of Bauddha/ Boudha. ...which in Tibetan is called Yambu Chorten Chenpo (Tibetan: ཡམ་བུའི་མཆོད་རྟེན་ཆེན་པོ། Wylie: yam bu'i mchod rten chenpo). Jya Rung Khashor Chorten Chenpo, literally which may be translated as "Chorten of poultry fallen promise" The stupa has an interesting history of its own which explains this strange name.

In Buddhist tradition Kāśyapa or Kassapa Buddha was the Buddha who preceded Śākyamuni Buḍḍha, the twenty-seventh of the twenty-nine named Buddhas, though he lived a long time before Śākyamuni. 

After Kāśyapa Buddha's demise, a certain old woman, a poultry keeper, Ma-jha-zi-ma (Tibetan: མ་བྱ་རྫི་མ། Wyle: ma bya rzi ma mother bird caretaker) with her four sons, interred this great sage's remains at the spot over which the great mound now stands, the latter having been built by the woman herself. Before starting on the work of construction, she petitioned the King of the time to grant her land the size of a buffalo skin. Thinking it would be small the king gave permission for land and to build her stupa. However the poultry woman carefully cut the skin in a long strip, like a rope and used it to circumscribe a large area.

By the time that, as a result of great sacrifices on the part of the woman and her four sons, the groundwork of the structure had been finished, those who saw it were astonished at the greatness of the scale on which it was undertaken. The high officials and wealthy people of the country were ashamed, if such a poor old woman were allowed to complete building such a stupendous tower, they themselves would have to dedicate a temple as great as a mountain, and so they decided to ask the King to disallow further progress of the work. When the King was approached on the matter his Majesty replied: "I have finished giving the order to the woman to proceed with the work. Kings must not eat their words, and I cannot undo my orders now" which is known as (Kha-Shor), mouth-fallen thus, the name came as Jya Rung Kha Shor. So the stupa was allowed to be finished, and hence its unique name, "Jya Rung Kha Shor Chorten Chenpo."

Tamang an ethnically Tibetan group in Nepal, have been living around Boudha for many centuries and still own land surrounding the area of Boudha stupa. 

Later the first Chiniya Lama came from China and assisted the Nepal ruler with translation during war negotiations. In return he was granted land for a monastery and residence in front of the stupa. He married the daughter of Jung Bahadur Rana (through his Tamang wife who was born in Boudha) and thus became connected with both the Ranas and the Tamang community. Today his descendants still have a role regarding the stupa though management is now devolved to the Shree Boudha Nath Area Development Committee which was established as part of the UNESCO requirements for protection of the World Heritage Site Monument Zone.

History

Licchavi records 
The Gopālarājavaṃśāvalī says Boudhanath was founded by the Nepalese Licchavi king Śivadeva (c. 590–604 CE); though other Nepalese chronicles date it to the reign of King Mānadeva (464–505 CE). Tibetan sources claim a mound on the site was excavated in the late 15th or early 16th century and the bones of King Aṃshuvarmā 605–621 were discovered there.

The earliest historical references to the Khaasti Chaitya are found in the Chronicles of the Newars. First, Khaasti is mentioned as one of the four stupas found by the Licchavi king Vrisadeva (c. AD 400) or Vikramjit. Second, the Newars legend of the stupa's origin attributes it to king Dharmadeva's son, Manadeva as atonement for his unwitting parricide Manadeva was the great Licchavi king, military conqueror and the patron of the arts who reigned c. AD 464–505. Manadeva is also linked with the Swayambhu Chaitya of Gum Bahal. Third, another great Licchhavi king Shivadeva (AD 590–604) is associated with Boudha by an inscription; he may have restored the chaitya.

According to the history of Nepal, the palace of King Vikramjit (Licchavi King) once stood where the Naranhiti Palace currently stands. King Vikramjit instructed that a Hiti should be built in the southern part of palace courtyard, but there was no sign of water from the Hiti, for which the king consulted Astrologers. Astrologers suggested that a sacrifice with a male candidate having ‘swee-nita lachhyan'(स्वीनिता लछ्यन), or thirty-two perfections should be performed. Only the king himself and his two princes were suitable candidates. So, the king decided to sacrifice himself and ordered one of his sons to sacrifice him so that sign of water could be seen at the Hiti. The king told his son that a man will be sleeping by covering his face and body, and to sacrifice him without looking at his face. After the son did so, he realised he had killed his own father. With regret and guilty he consulted with priests for way to salvation. The priests suggested him to fly a ‘bwo-khaa'(ब्वःखा) a flying hen from the top of Mhaasu Khwaa Maju(म्हासु ख्वा: माजु). The hen landed in the place where the chaitya is currently standing. An Ajimaa was already located at that place before the chaitya construction started. During the time of its construction, the place was struck with a drought and the people managed to abate the scarcity of water by collecting the droplets of dew. Dew is called ‘Khasu'(खसु) and droplets are called ‘Ti'(ति).

Historians suggest that the traditional knowledge to harvest dew droplets have been lost with time. The places that end with ‘Ti'(ति) have similar history, such as Chalati(चलति), Kusunti(कुसिन्ति), and so on. Khaasti Ajimaa(खास्ति अजिमा) is one of the important Ajima of Kathmandu. The Newa tradition consider Ajima as super power. These female energies protect the nation. The tradition of Kumari relates to a place called ‘Kumari-gaal’ which is south to Khaasti.

Tibetan records 

However, the emperor Trisong Detsen (r. 755 to 797) of the Tibetan Empire is also traditionally associated with the construction of the Boudhanath Stupa. The Yolmo Shakya Zangpo from Helambu resurrected Boudhanath. Princess of Nepal Bhrikuti married the King of Tibet Songtsen Gampo. His other Chinese wife and Bhrikuti are credited for introduction and spread of Buddhism in Tibet. Along Songtsen Gampo was Trisong Detsen, first Dharma King under him. While Buddhism was spreading in Tibet, and Tibet-Nepal trade relations were being stronger, a widow Tibetan woman travelled from Lhasa to visit Khaasti. She brought her four sons and they were fascinated by witnessing how Newa people constructed chaitya, a meta-symbolic construction with distinct levels of suggestion, sagacity and profoundness. The woman's name was Jyajhima, who took shade for many days in Khaasti. Impressed by the hospitality of Newars, she and her sons went back to Lhasa and told people stories about her experience in Nepal. She is notable as in those times, only traders and specially men were ones traveling Nepal-Tibet and back. She was fascinated by Khaasti, when she heard stories of Bhrikuti spread in Lhasa. Being a widow woman she had to ask permission from the king to visit Khaasti.

The story of Jya dzi ma, the poultry woman is also acknowledged by the local Newars, because of her attraction to the pilgrimage. It is said that she spent many days with her four sons in the premises of Khaasti before going back to Lhasa. A painting of Jadzima is on the rear of the Hariti/ Mamala temple at Boudha. A pond with ducks is seen and the lady taking care of them.

In C15 a Tibetan lama, a treasure revealer/ terton, discovered a text said to have been concealed by Guru Rinpoche.  In this text the conversation between Guru Rinpoche and king Trisong Detsun is recorded in which Guru Rinpoche explains the origin of the stupa and the story of Jadzima. The terma continues after the completion of the stupa to explain how the sons, the donkey and the buffalo are reborn in C8 Tibet as ministers and lamas, and in later in C9 as Langdarma, the anti-buddhist king.

Shakya Zangpo came to Nepal in search of the stupa but found only an abandoned mound. He undertook a restoration during which he is said to have found the remains of Nepali king Amsuverma (the alleged father of Srongsten Gampo's nepali queen Bhrikuti). His restoration is likely to have resulted in the stupa in the saze we see today. He is believed to have resided at the place now called Chabahil during the work.

2015 Earthquake
The April 2015 Nepal earthquake badly damaged Boudhanath Stupa, severely cracking the spire. As a result, the whole structure above the dome, and the religious relics it contained had to be removed, which was completed by the end of October 2015. The reconstruction began on 3 November 2015 with the ritual placement of a new central pole or "life tree" for the stupa at the top of the dome.

The stupa was reopened on 22 November 2016. The renovation and reconstruction was organised by the Boudhanath Area Development Committee (BADC). The repairs were funded entirely by private donations from Buddhist groups and volunteers. According to the BADC, it cost $2.1 million dollars and more than 30kg of gold. The repaired building was officially inaugurated by Prime Minister Pushpa Kamal Dahal. However, the Nepalese government was criticised for its slow pace in reconstructing quake-damaged heritage structures such as temples, with many left unrepaired.

Panorama

Gallery

See also
Kora (pilgrimage)
Swayambhunath
List of Stupas in Nepal

References

Further reading
The Legend of the Great Stupa and The Life Story of the Lotus Born Guru. Keith Dowman. (1973). Tibetan Nyingma Meditation Center. Dharma Books. Berkeley, California.
Psycho-Cosmic Symbolism of the Buddhist Stūpa. Lama Anagarika Govinda. (1976) Dharma Books. Berkeley, California. ;  (pbk).

External links

 Kathmandu heritage sites listed by UNESCO Nepal
 Boudhanath at Khandro.net : Information on Legends and Prophecies
 The History of the Great Jarung Kashor Stupa of Boudhanath : English Translation of the 15th-century Tibetan History
 

Buddhist pilgrimage sites in Nepal
Religious buildings and structures in Kathmandu
Stupas in Nepal
Tourist attractions in Kathmandu
World Heritage Sites in Nepal
Newa Heritages
5th-century establishments in Nepal
Hindu communities
Buddhist communities of Nepal